Oyugis is a settlement in Kenya's Homa Bay County.

History 
Before the Kenyan general election in 2013, Oyugis voted as part of the Nyanza Province.

References 

Populated places in Nyanza Province